Mydas arizonensis is a species of mydas flies in the family Mydidae.

References

Mydidae
Articles created by Qbugbot
Insects described in 1989